The Dogs of Riga is a Swedish detective mystery by Henning Mankell, set in Riga, the capital of Latvia. It is the second book of the Kurt Wallander series, and was translated into English by Laurie Thompson.

The book was a finalist for the Los Angeles Times Book Prize for Mystery/Thriller.

Plot 
A lifeboat floats ashore at the coast of Skåne. Inside are two dead men who've been murdered. Policeman Kurt Wallander is assigned to the case. The men are identified with the help of the police in Latvia. One of their officers, Detective Liepa, travels to Sweden to assist the investigation, but when he returns to his home country he is mysteriously murdered. Kurt flies to Riga to find out why and is drawn into complex conspiracy.

Adaptation 
The novel was adapted into a theatrical film by Swedish public broadcaster Sveriges Television in 1995. Wallander is played by Rolf Lassgård. The film was directed by Per Berglund and released in the United States as The Hounds of Riga.

The novel also serves as the basis for an episode in the third season of the British production of Wallander starring Kenneth Branagh as the title character, and guest starring Søren Malling, Ingeborga Dapkunaite, and Anamaria Marinca.

References

External links 
IMDB entry for The Dogs of Riga - 1995 adaptation
 - 2012 adaption

1992 Swedish novels
Novels by Henning Mankell
Wallander
Novels set in Latvia
Ordfront books